Euan Ferrie (born 10 May 1996) is a Scottish rugby union player who plays for Glasgow Warriors in the United Rugby Championship. He plays at Flanker and Lock.

Rugby Union career

Amateur career

Ferrie came through the school ranks at Calderglen High School of St Leonards, East Kilbride and then played for East Kilbride.

He then moved to play for Hamilton Bulls; and then moved again to play for Glasgow Hawks.

Professional career

He joined the Scottish Rugby Academy as a Stage 3 player in season 2021-22 and was assigned to Glasgow Warriors.

He was also placed in the Boroughmuir Bears squad for the Super 6 season.

He played for Glasgow Warriors against Ayrshire Bulls on 2 September 2022 in the pre-season match at Inverness.

He made his competitive debut for the Glasgow side in the United Rugby Championship against Benetton Rugby, nearly scoring a debut try moments after taking the field. He became Glasgow Warrior No. 347.

He followed that up in the next round match against Leinster at the RDS Arena.

He made his European debut for Glasgow against Bath Rugby in the 2022–23 EPCR Challenge Cup, in a 22 - 19 win for the Warriors.

He signed out of the academy on 23 January 2023 by agreeing a professional contract with Glasgow Warriors.

International career

He played for Scotland U19.

Ferrie played for Scotland U20 in 2021.

References

2001 births
Living people
Glasgow Warriors players
Scottish rugby union players
Rugby union flankers
East Kilbride RFC players
Glasgow Hawks players
Boroughmuir RFC players
Hamilton RFC players